Zhu "Judy" Long (born 15 January 1969) is a female Chinese-born table tennis player who now represents Canada. She was born in Beijing, and resides in Ottawa, Ontario.

References

COC Profile

External links
 
 
 

1969 births
Living people
Canadian female table tennis players
Table tennis players at the 2007 Pan American Games
Table tennis players at the 2008 Summer Olympics
Olympic table tennis players of Canada
Canadian people of Chinese descent
Sportspeople from Beijing
Sportspeople from Ottawa
Table tennis players from Beijing
Pan American Games silver medalists for Canada
Pan American Games medalists in table tennis
Naturalised table tennis players
Medalists at the 2007 Pan American Games